Eugene J. Watts (October 17, 1942 – November 11, 2008) was a member of the Ohio Senate, United States, serving the 16th district. His district encompassed the western portions of Columbus, Ohio. In 2000, he faced term limits, and was succeeded by Priscilla D. Mead. He was a Professor Emeritus of History at Ohio State University. He served in the Army during the Vietnam War and rose to the rank of captain and earned a Bronze Star. He completed his PhD studies at Emory University in Atlanta. During his tenure in the Ohio Senate he was an advocate for veteran affairs and education.

Publications

References

External links
Obituary

Republican Party Ohio state senators
1942 births
2008 deaths
20th-century American politicians